Diodora italica, the keyhole limpet or Italian keyhole limpet, is a sea snail or limpet, a marine prosobranch gastropod mollusk in the family Fissurellidae, the keyhole limpets.

Fossil reports
The fossil records of this species dates back to the Miocene (age range: from 23.03 to 0.012 million years ago). These fossils have been found in Italy, Spain, Cyprus, Greece, Moldova and Slovakia.

Description
The basic color is whitish or grayish with small radial ribs and sometimes with 8-10 dark gray or brownish bands radiating from the centre.

Biology
Water for respiration and excretion is drawn in under the edge of the shell and exits through the "keyhole" at or near the apex. Like all other fissurellids, these sea snails are herbivores, and use the radula to scrape algae from rocks.

Distribution and habitat
This species occurs in the Mediterranean Sea and the North Atlantic Ocean and lives on stony soils at a depth of about 10 meters.

References

External links
 Encyclopedia of life
 Idscaro

Fissurellidae
Gastropods described in 1820